African immigration to Norway (Norwegian: Afrikaner) refers to immigrants to Norway from Africa. An estimated 131,700 people in Norway are either first or second generation immigrants from Africa. Most of these have a background as  asylum seekers.

Distribution

Horn of Africa
Immigration from countries from the Horn of Africa to Norway grew slightly from the end of the 1980s, but grew markedly from 2000 onwards. The growth is usually attributed mainly to a rise in the number of refugees from Somalia (43,273), Eritrea (27,855) and Ethiopia (11,505). Around 30% of all Africans in Norway are of Somali descent, around 20% are Eritreans, and the other 50% (65.850) are from the rest of Africa.

Other Africans
Compared with immigrants from Somalia and Eritrea , the percentage of Africans from other regions of Africa is low.
 
Most other Africans in Norway come from West Africa, especially Ghana (2,034), Gambia (1,409) and Nigeria (1,247). There is also a sizeable population of Africans from the Democratic Republic of the Congo (2,050), and there are also a Moroccan community in Norway.

Crime
According to Statistics Norway, in the 2010-2013 period, the proportion of African-born perpetrators of criminal offences aged 15 and older in Norway was 107.1 per 1000 residents. When corrected for variables such as age and gender as well as employment, the total decreased to 90.06. This is higher compared to the averages of 44.9 among native Norwegians. Somali-born perpetrators of criminal offences was 123.8 and 102.3 after age and gender adjustment. For Eritrean-born perpetrators of criminal offences it was 79.9 and 67.1 after age and gender adjustment.
Immigrants from Africa had a higher crime rate compared to migrants from other parts of the world. Asian-born perpetrators of criminal offences was 75.5 and 66.9 after age and gender adjustment, and for Eastern European-born the numbers where 73.2 and 59.0 after age and gender adjustment.

Demographics

Country of origin
Most African Norwegians have a background from the following countries:

Regional distribution
Norwegians with African background live in the following electoral districts:

The " * " symbol demarcates figures from 2010

Notable people

See also

African immigration to Europe
Eritreans in Norway
Ethiopians in Norway
Moroccans in Norway
Somalis in Norway

References